One Rus is a political party in Ukraine.

It was established in June 2003 as the Slavic People's Patriotic Union. On November 8, 2005, the party changed to the name of Party of Putin Policy. In the 2006 Ukrainian parliamentary election, the party won 0.12% of the vote and no seats. In December 2008, it changed to its current name. (After it had skipped participation in the 2007 Ukrainian parliamentary election.)

In the 2012 Ukrainian parliamentary election, the party won no (constituency) seats; it had competed in 3 constituencies. In constituency 10 located in Bakhchysarai its candidate had won 5.15% of the votes, in constituency 2 located in Simferopol  2.10% and in constituency 4 located in Yevpatoria 0.83%.

The party did not participate in the 2014 Ukrainian parliamentary election.

References

External links

Russian political parties in Ukraine
Political parties established in 2003